Santa Lucía Airport ,  is a rural airport  east of Freire, a town in the Araucanía Region of Chile.

See also

Transport in Chile
List of airports in Chile

References

External links
OpenStreetMap - Santa Lucía
OurAirports - Santa Lucía
FallingRain - Santa Lucía Airport

Airports in Chile
Airports in La Araucanía Region